The 2004–05 edition of the VB Series (so-called because of sponsor Victoria Bitter) was a three-team One Day International men's cricket tournament held in Australia in January and February 2005, between the hosting nation's team, Pakistan, and West Indies. The teams played each other three times , with five points awarded for a win and a possible bonus point awarded either to the winners or losers depending on run rate. The top two teams on points went through to the best-of-three finals series. Five of the nine preliminary games were day-night matches, and both finals played were night matches.

Squads

Notes

Group stage table

Schedule

Group stage matches

1st match: Australia v West Indies, 14 January

2nd match: Australia v Pakistan, 16 January

3rd match: Pakistan v West Indies, 19 January

4th match: Australia v West Indies, 21 January

5th match: Australia v Pakistan, 23 January

6th match: Australia v West Indies, 26 January

7th match: Pakistan v West Indies, 28 January

8th match:  Australia v Pakistan, 30 January

9th match: Pakistan v West Indies, 1 February

Finals

1st final: Australia v Pakistan, 4 February

2nd final: Australia v Pakistan, 6 February

References

External links
 2004–05 VB Series

International cricket competitions in 2004–05
Australian Tri-Series